The Saint Martin national football team is the football team of the Collectivity of Saint Martin, the French half of the island of Saint Martin which was previously part of the French overseas department of Guadeloupe (not to be confused with the team of the Dutch half, the Sint Maarten national football team) and is controlled by the Comité de Football des Îles du Nord. Saint Martin is not a member of FIFA, and is therefore not eligible to enter the World Cup, but it does compete in CONCACAF competitions.

History
Saint Martin played their first competitive match during the 1990 Caribbean Cup qualifiers against British Virgin Islands, winning 3–0. They beat Anguilla (4–0) and Cayman Islands (8–3 on aggregate) to advance to the final qualifying round where they failed to progress, losing 1–0 to Jamaica in the decisive group game.

Saint Martin would not enter the next nine Caribbean Cup tournaments, before returning in the 2001 qualification process, beating Anguilla and Montserrat before finishing six points behind Cuba in the final round of qualifying. In 2005 qualifying, Saint Martin failed to advance past the first qualifying round, losing heavily to Jamaica (12–0). From 2007 to 2012, Saint Martin were knocked out in the first round in every qualifying competition.

In August 2014, Saint Martin played a friendly against the British Virgin Islands, the territory's first match since 2012. At that time, SMFA president Fabrice Baly announced a 3-year project to fully return to Caribbean international football. He established long-term objectives of attracting the attention of international recruiters and qualifying for the 2017 CONCACAF Gold Cup. Saint Martin withdrew from 2017 Caribbean Cup qualification, ending the project that Baly had started.

In 2019, Saint Martin entered the qualification for the first CONCACAF Nations League, losing all four of their matches and finishing bottom of the standings, placing them into League C where they finished third, three points off from qualifying for League B.

Results and fixtures
The following is a list of match results in the last 12 months, as well as any future matches that have been scheduled.

2022

2023

Coaching history

  Owen Nickie (2004)
  Gérard Andy (2006–2008)
  Jean-Louis Richards & David Baltase (2010)
  Dominique Rénia (2012)
  David Baltase (2018)
  Stéphane Auvray (2019–present)

Players

Current squad
The following players were called up for two friendlies against Anguilla and  Saint Barthélemy on 4 and 10 March 2023.

Caps and goals as of 4 March 2023 after the game against Anguilla.

Recent call ups
Following players have been called up in previous 12 months.

Records

Players in bold are still active with Saint Martin.

Most appearances

Top goalscorers

Competitive record

CONCACAF Gold Cup record

CONCACAF Nations League record

Caribbean Cup record

Record by opponent
Updated on 14 June 2022 after match against

National football stadium

References

External links
Official website

 
Caribbean national association football teams
CONCACAF teams not affiliated to FIFA
National football teams of Overseas France